James Dornan (born 17 March 1953) is a Scottish National Party (SNP) politician who is Member of the Scottish Parliament (MSP) for Glasgow Cathcart.

Raised in the Oatlands neighbourhood of southern Glasgow, Dornan joined the Scottish National Party in 1996 and previously worked for Stewart Maxwell (MSP).

He was elected in the 2011 Parliamentary elections, having previously contested the Ayr Constituency in the 2003 Scottish Parliament elections and the Glasgow South-West Constituency in the 2005 UK general election before his election in 2011. He was also selected to be the SNP candidate in the 2009 Glasgow North East by-election, but decided to step aside after it was reported that he may have breached charity law by acting as an "unpaid" partner-director of Culture and Sport Glasgow while he was covered by a protected trust deed - an arrangement which avoids a court-ordered bankruptcy.

He represented the Langside ward on Glasgow City Council from 3 May 2007 until 3 May 2012 and was the SNP group leader on the council until June 2011, when he was succeeded by Councillor Allison Hunter.

In 2012, Dornan was appointed as a SNP Depute Whip.

On 25 February 2020, Dornan announced he would not be standing at the 2021 Scottish Parliament election. However, in July 2020, he reversed his decision and announced that he would put himself forward again for election. Later in July 2020, the SNP National Executive Committee voted have an all-woman shortlist for the Glasgow Cathcart Scottish Parliamentary constituency, ending his bid of standing for the seat again. However, after the decision, Dornan announced that he would challenge the decision. The SNP National Secretary then reversed the all-woman shortlist and Dornan was permitted to stand. Dornan was selected to stand for the SNP in the Glasgow Cathcart Scottish Parliamentary constituency and held the seat with 57% of the vote.

Dornan believes in Scottish independence and has often appeared on Kremlin propaganda station RT to champion the cause.

Controversies

In May 2019, Dornan was accused of homophobia after using the word 'fag' to describe a gay Conservative MP, Ross Thomson. The Scottish Conservatives complained that "Dornan has form when it comes to making crass and offensive remarks" and he apologised for his use of language.

In June 2021 Dornan accused Lothian Buses of sectarianism after the bus cancelled scheduled services on St Patrick's Day. In fact, the bus company's services had been suspended because of anti-social behaviour. Conservative MSP Sue Webber described the remarks as "completely false and poisonous" and urged him to apologise. After pressure from SNP councillors in Edinburgh, Dornan apologised privately to the bus company for his mistake.

In July 2021 Dornan was reported to the Ethical Standards Commissioner after commenting on a post by Conservative cabinet minister, Jacob Rees-Mogg. Rees-Mogg, a practising Catholic, had tweeted about his visit to the Border Force National Command Centre and the British Government's Nationality and Borders Bill. In response Dornan tweeted: "Hope you remember this the next time you go to confession. You and your cronies are already responsible for the deaths of thousands and you’re now happy to see the most desperate people in the world suffer and drown. If your god exists you will undoubtedly rot in hell." The SNP later apologised to Rees-Mogg, who said it was "most gracious", adding: "But I think this SNP MSP is entitled to discuss the likely prospects of my immortal soul. It’s quite interesting that you're getting the discussion of hell in public life. I think that is theologically interesting concept and I'm glad he takes such an orthodox, Catholic view of the reality of that and that is encouraging."

In February 2022 BBC journalist Sarah Smith said she was relieved to have escaped the "bile, hatred and misogyny" she had endured covering Scottish politics, having moved to Washington to serve as the BBC's North America Editor. She recounted one instance in which someone shouted at her from their car, "What f***ing lies you’re going to be telling on TV tonight, you f***ing lying bitch?" Dornan tweeted “America would be the go to place to escape all her imaginary woes then.” The comment was widely condemned by his political opponents and Dornan later tweeted an apology, “for my earlier comments that made it seem as though I believed the abuse Sarah Smith has suffered was imaginary”. Tory MSP Russell Findlay, a former crime reporter who had acid thrown at his face by a gangster, accused Dornan of “gaslighting” Smith and warned, “Cowardly attacks on journalists by the lunatic brigade in Scotland have become increasingly toxic since 2014. There's a risk that personal abuse escalates and that someone will get hurt."

References

External links 
 

1953 births
Living people
Councillors in Glasgow
Scottish National Party MSPs
Members of the Scottish Parliament 2011–2016
Members of the Scottish Parliament 2016–2021
Members of the Scottish Parliament 2021–2026
Members of the Scottish Parliament for Glasgow constituencies
Scottish people of Irish descent